EHC Biel-Bienne is a professional ice hockey club based in the bilingual city of Biel/Bienne, Switzerland and plays in the National League (NL). Since the city of Biel is completely bilingual, alongside the German name EHC Biel (Abbr: EHCB) the team also has a French name, HC Bienne (Abbr: HCB). The team plays its home games in the 6,521-seat Tissot Arena.

History
EHC Biel played in lower Swiss ice hockey leagues until they got promoted in the second-tier Swiss League in 1960. In 1975 EHC Biel won the Swiss League-title and got promoted to the first level, the National League. During the 20 years between 1975 and 1995 the club won three national championships in 1978, 1981 and 1983 under three coaches (František Vanek, Ed Reigle, Kent Ruhnke). After the relegation in 1995 EHC Biel had to wait 13 years until their return to the NL. After three consecutive championship victories in the second-tier Swiss League, EHC Biel was reinstated into the NL, winning the promotion/relegation best of 7 series against EHC Basel 4-0 in 2008.

A strong local rivalry exists with the SCL Tigers, SC Bern, EHC Olten, and HC Ajoie. Games between these teams often attract sell-out crowds.

During the 2012–13 NHL lockout, Biel were strengthen by the acquisitions of NHL All-Stars Tyler Seguin and Patrick Kane. They were joined by future NHL players, goalkeeper Reto Berra and winger Nikolaj Ehlers.

Honors

Champions
NL Championship (3): 1978, 1981, 1983
SL Championship (5): 1975, 2004, 2006, 2007, 2008

Players

Current roster
Updated 11 February 2023.

Notable alumni 

Jean-Jacques Aeschlimann 
Olivier Anken
Mauro Beccarelli
Gaetan Boucher
Gino Cavallini 
Chris Chelios
Gilles Dubois
Daniel Dubuis
Normand Dupont
Heinz Ehlers
Rico Fata
Pierre-Alain Flotiront
René Furler 
Paul Gagné 
Gaston Gingras
Richmond Gosselin
Shawn Heaphy
Jonas Hiller
Barry Jenkins
Ramil Juldashew
Patrick Kane
Willy Kohler
Jakob Kölliker
Francis Lardon
Steve Latinovitch
Marc Leuenberger
Bob Lindberg
Kevin Lötscher
Urs Lott
Serge Martel
Serge Meyer
Cyrill Pasche
Guido Pfosi
Dan Poulin
Jörg Reber
Michel Riesen
Valeri Schirjajew
Kevin Schläpfer
Björn Schneider
Sven Schmid 
Tyler Seguin
Jiri Slegr
Laurent Stehlin
Martin Steinegger
Alexandre Tremblay
Marko Tuomainen
Claude Vilgrain
Marco Wegmüller
Daniel Widmer
Bernhard Wist
Aldo Zenhäusern

References

External links

 EHC Biel official website
 Website Fanclub Fire-Lords
 Website Fanclub Seeschwalbe
 Website Fanclub Red Youngs 05
 Website A2 Supporter Club EHC Biel
 Blog "Fan du HC Bienne"
 

Ice hockey teams in Switzerland
Biel/Bienne